Józef Dominik Korwin-Kossakowski (16 August 1771 in Vaitkuškis near Ukmergė – 2 November 1840 in Warsaw), was a Polish–Lithuanian statesman and military commander, a participant of Targowica Confederation and a colonel of the Polish Army. He used the Ślepowron coat of arms.

Kossakowski  had been a member of the Four-Year Sejm and was awarded the Order of the White Eagle by King Stanisław August Poniatowski in 1793. He fought in the Grande Armée during the Napoleon's invasion of Russia and was one of the commanders in the November Uprising.

He married Ludwika Zofia Potocka, daughter of Stanisław Szczęsny Potocki.

He was the owner of Vepriai manor from 1808 until his death in 1840, when it was inherited by his daughter Pelagia Kossakowska-Bower St. Clair.

External links
 Józef Dominik's genealogy 

1771 births
1840 deaths
People from Ukmergė District Municipality
Jozef
Targowica confederates
Polish commanders of the Napoleonic Wars
November Uprising participants
Recipients of the Legion of Honour